Milesia insignis is a species of hoverfly in the family Syrphidae.

Distribution
China.

References

Insects described in 1990
Eristalinae
Diptera of Asia